The Department of Energy and Environment (DOEE) - formerly the District Department of the Environment - serves as an agency within the Executive Branch of the District of Columbia (DC) government in the United States to consolidate the administration and oversight of environmental and energy programs, services, laws, and regulations. Under the authority of [DC Law 16-51], DOEE was formed through a merger of the DC Government's Environmental Health Administration, the DC Energy Office, policy functions of the Tree Management Administration and policy functions of the Office of Recycling.

DOEE is a "one-stop shop" for programs and services that protect human health and the environment and address energy efficiency issues for all sectors of the city. DOEE programs are designed to facilitate cleaner air and water, green our neighborhoods and building space, and assist with the management of hazardous and toxic waste disposal. Additionally, DOEE conducts community and educational outreach to increase public awareness of environmental and energy related issues.

References

External links
 Official web site

Government of the District of Columbia
State environmental protection agencies of the United States